Dendrocephalus is a genus of fairy shrimp found in South and North America. It is characterised by the presence of an antenna-like appendage arising between the second antennae and the eyestalks. The genus comprises 16 species in two subgenera:
Dendrocephalus Daday, 1908
Dendrocephalus affinis Pereira, 1984 – Venezuela
Dendrocephalus argentinus Pereira & Belk, 1987 – Paraguay
Dendrocephalus brasiliensis Pesta, 1921 – Argentina, Brazil
Dendrocephalus cervicornis (Weltner, 1890) – Argentina
Dendrocephalus conosurius Pereira & Ruiz, 1995
Dendrocephalus cornutus Pereira & Belk, 1987 – Costa Rica
Dendrocephalus geayi Daday, 1908 – Venezuela
Dendrocephalus goiasensis Rabet & Thiéry, 1996 – Brazil
Dendrocephalus orientalis Rabet & Thiéry, 1996 – Brazil
Dendrocephalus sarmentosus Pereira & Belk, 1987 – Galápagos Islands
Dendrocephalus spartaenovae Margalef, 1967 – Venezuela
Dendrocephalus thieryi Rabet, 2006 – Brazil
Dendrocephalus venezolanus Pereira, 1984 – Venezuela
Dendrocephalinus Rogers, 2006
Dendrocephalus acacioidea (Belk & Sissom, 1992) – United States
Dendrocephalus alachua (Dexter, 1953) – United States
Dendrocephalus lithaca Creaser, 1940 – United States

References

Anostraca
Branchiopoda genera